Golder Associates Inc., branded as just Golder, is an international company that provides consulting, design, and construction services in earth, environment, and related areas of energy. The company has 7,000 employees in offices in Africa, Asia, Australasia, Europe, North America and South America. In April 2021, the company was acquired by WSP Global.

History 

The company was founded in Toronto, Ontario, Canada in 1960 by Hugh Golder, Victor Milligan, Larry Soderman, under the name H.Q. Golder and Associates, and focused on soil mechanics and ground engineering.

In the 1970s, the service offering expanded to include rock mechanics. In the 1980s the company's groundwater practice evolved to encompass the broader field of hydrogeology, with particular expertise in contaminated soil and groundwater. In the early 1990s, as public awareness of environmental issues increased, Golder added biological capabilities – including aquatic and terrestrial biology – to its range of services. Hydrology and hydraulic engineering were added in the late 1990s, and Geographic Information Systems (GIS), information management, cultural sciences and energy services were added in the 2000s. In the mid 2000, Golder added Environmental, Health, and Safety providing a wide range of services to assist companies in protecting their employees and the environment. Consultants can conduct studies on air, water, ergonomics, as well as evaluating health and safety programs for compliance. On site audits provide valuable information and corrective actions for employers.

The company was an employee-owned corporation, until it was acquired by WSP Global in 2021.  the company continues to operate under the "Golder" brand.

Geographic expansion 

The company established other offices in Canada in the early 1960s, later expanding into the United States (1968), as well as the United Kingdom and Australia (1972). Since that time, the company grew geographically through a combination of opening new offices and through mergers with existing companies. Offices (2009) were located in St. Petersburg, Russia and Delhi, India.

Sectors 

Within the areas of consulting, design, and construction services in earth, environment, and energy, Golder works with clients in many industries: from oil and gas to mining to transportation and more.

 Manufacturing
 Mining
 Oil & Gas
 Power
 Urban Development & Infrastructure
 Manufactures 
 Construction
 Laboratory
 Light industrial firms

Services provided 

 Engineering: Construction Materials Engineering, Testing & Instrumentation Services, Dams & Hydropower Services, Ground Engineering Services, Pipeline Systems Services, Tunnelling Services, Waste Management Services
 Environmental & Social Assessment: Cultural Heritage Services, Ecological Services, Environmental & Social Impact Assessment Services, Social Management & Compliance Services
 Environmental Management and Compliance: Atmospheric Services, Environment, Health & Safety & Industrial Hygiene Services, Human Health & Toxicology Services, Energy, Carbon & Climate Services, Permitting Services, Sustainability Services, Contaminant Site Investigation & Clean Up Services, Performance & Assurance Services, Human Health & Ecological Risk Assessment Services, REACH & Chemical Management Regulatory Services, Public Health Assessment Services, Aquatic Effects Assessment Services
 Natural Resources Planning & Evaluation: Resource Evaluation Services, Geochemical Services, Mine Planning & Engineering Services, Mine Waste Management Services, Backfill Systems Services
  Strategic Planning, Advice & Management Services: Information Management & Graphics Services, Project Management Services, Mergers & Acquisitions, Divestiture & Due Diligence Services, Risk Assessment & Decision Analysis Services, Planning, Landscape Architecture & Urban Design Services, Facility Siting Services
 Water: Water & Wastewater Treatment Services, Coastal & Marine Services, Groundwater Services, Surface Water & Hydrology Services

References 

Consulting firms of Canada
Engineering companies of Canada
Consulting firms established in 1960
1960 establishments in Canada